GEMS Wellington International School is a private school situated in the Al Sufouh area of Dubai in the United Arab Emirates. The school  has over 3000 students enrolled over all age groups. GEMS Wellington International School is a registered international school from FS-1 to Year 13. The school is part of the GEMS group of schools, an international school business.

Curriculum
Wellington International School follows the British curriculum and IB curriculum. The school offers iGCSEs, GCSEs and the International Baccalaureate and careers programmes for years 12 and 13. Science, English and Mathematics are compulsory subjects throughout the school. Students begin their secondary school years in Key Stage 3 (Years 7, 8 and 9), following the National Curriculum of England and Wales, and then move into Key Stage 4 (Years 10 and 11). During KS4 they sit a range of UK national exams GCSE (General Certificate of Secondary Education) and IGCSE (International General Certificate of Secondary Education). If students achieve the required grades they can go onto an advanced level of study which is a prerequisite for university. This course is done in the last two years of school (which are non-compulsory) and are spent in Key Stage 5.

Academics 
In 2018, 60% of the students achieved straight A-A* grades in their GCSEs while 95% of the students achieved 5 A*-C grades. In the same year, the highest IB results achieved by students at the WIS was 44 out of 45, while the average was 34.

Students
As of 2018, the school had 2,500 students.

Facilities 
The facilities include an indoor, air-conditioned swimming pool, an indoor multipurpose sports hall, three outdoor basketball/netball courts, two outdoor tennis courts, a soccer field, a gym, multiple science laboratories, an astronomy observatory, a recording studio, an underground dance studio, two music rooms, media room and an auditorium. In addition, there is a library and five computer laboratories with over 120 computers. There are separate wings and playgrounds for each division and a separate common room for their Post-16 students called the Falcon Centre.

Extracurricular activities 
Significant extracurricular activities participated in by Wellington International School include Model United Nations, the Duke of Edinburgh's Award, and F1 in Schools.

Model United Nations 
The school has regularly participated in local Model United Nations events. In 2015, the school started hosting their own event, Wellington International School Model United Nations. WISMUN 2015 was the inaugural annual conference, which had over 11 schools in attendance and featured 3 committees: General Assembly 1, Human Rights Council and Security Council.

TEDxWIS 
Since 2011, the school has hosted annual TEDxWIS events featuring key speakers from students throughout all grades in the school.

Musical production 
Every year, Wellington hosts a musical production with students participating in every year group. Recent performances include Starstruck, which was an original play written by Claire Bennet, a drama teacher at Wellington; The Wizard of Oz, Grease and High School Musical.

Golf 
Students from Wellington International School annually create a workforce of over 100 people from years 10 and 12 to perform scoring duties the DP World Tour Championship, Dubai, the season-ending event of the European Tour.

KHDA inspection report
The Knowledge and Human Development Authority (KHDA) is an educational quality assurance authority based in Dubai, United Arab Emirates. It undertakes early learning, school and higher learning institution management, and rates schools on Dubai based on their performance. Schools can achieve from Outstanding to Unsatisfactory. Wellington International School is one of only two schools in Dubai to achieve Outstanding in the last 6 annual KHDA inspection reports.

A summary of the inspection ratings for GEMS Wellington International School:

A summary of all the schools in Dubai's ratings can be found at KHDA School Ratings.

References

External links
School Website http://www.wellingtoninternationalschool.com

British international schools in Dubai
GEMS schools
International schools in Dubai
Educational institutions established in 2005
2005 establishments in the United Arab Emirates